The men's double sculls competition at the 1936 Summer Olympics in Berlin took place are at Grünau on the Langer See.

Schedule

Results

Heats
First boat of each heat qualified to the final, remainder goes to the semifinal.

Heat 1

Heat 2

Semifinal
First two qualify to the final.

Heat 1

Heat 2

Final

References

External links
 Official Olympic Report

Rowing at the 1936 Summer Olympics